These are the official results of the Men's 1.500 metres event at the 1991 IAAF World Championships in Tokyo, Japan. There were a total number of 43 participating athletes, with three qualifying heats, two semi-finals and the final held on Sunday September 1, 1991.

Medalists

Schedule
All times are Japan Standard Time (UTC+9)

Records
Existing records at the start of the event.

Final

Semi-finals
Held on Friday 1991-08-30

Qualifying heats
Held on Thursday 1991-08-29

See also
 1987 Men's World Championships 1500 metres (Rome)
 1988 Men's Olympic 1500 metres (Seoul)
 1990 Men's European Championships 1500 metres (Split)
 1992 Men's Olympic 1500 metres (Barcelona)
 1993 Men's World Championships 1500 metres (Stuttgart)

References
 Results
 Results - World Athletics

 
1500 metres at the World Athletics Championships